Ryan James Harry Birtwistle (born 1 December 2003) is a Singaporean professional footballer who plays as a right wing-back for Premier League club Wolverhampton Wanderers.

Early life
Harry Birtwistle was born in Singapore on 1 December 2003 to an English father, John Birtwistle and a Singaporean mother. He holds a Singapore passport.

Club career

Wolverhampton Wanderers
Harry Birtwistle was first spotted and scouted by the Wolves academy staff when he was eight years old, as part of a Wolves international training camp in Singapore. Birtwistle then moved from Singapore to England in 2017 and he signed a scholarship with Wolverhampton Wanderers. Four years on, still just 17, he has broken into the under-23 side and made an impressive start to the season, scoring a couple of goals and catching the eye of Wolves' coaching staff in his favoured right wing-back position. He has also started training with the first team.

On 28 October 2021, it was announced that Birtwistle signed his first professional contract with the club which will run until the summer of 2024, making him the first Singapore-born player to sign for a Premier League club.

Personal life 
Harry Birtwistle had applied to renounce his Singapore citizenship, but it was denied as Singapore's Ministry of Defence indicated he had yet to fulfil his National Service (NS) obligations. His family "stated that [he] would not be registering for NS". His father, John, would later release a statement that the changes on work permit requirements for non-British citizens following the Brexit had made it essential for Harry to keep his British citizenship to pursue a football career in the Premier League, and Harry had not wanted to intentionally skip NS.

Career statistics

References

2003 births
Living people
Singaporean footballers
Singaporean people of English descent
Association football defenders
Wolverhampton Wanderers F.C. players
Singaporean expatriate footballers
Expatriate footballers in England